Substituted amphetamines are a class of compounds based upon the amphetamine structure; it includes all derivative compounds which are formed by replacing, or substituting, one or more hydrogen atoms in the amphetamine core structure with substituents. The compounds in this class span a variety of pharmacological subclasses, including stimulants, empathogens, and hallucinogens, among others. Examples of substituted amphetamines are amphetamine (itself), methamphetamine, ephedrine, cathinone, phentermine, mephentermine, bupropion, methoxyphenamine, selegiline, amfepramone (diethylpropion), pyrovalerone, MDMA (ecstasy), and DOM (STP).

Some of amphetamine's substituted derivatives occur in nature, for example in the leaves of Ephedra and khat plants. Amphetamine was first produced at the end of the 19th century. By the 1930s, amphetamine and some of its derivative compounds found use as decongestants in the symptomatic treatment of colds and also occasionally as psychoactive agents.  Their effects on the central nervous system are diverse, but can be summarized by three overlapping types of activity: psychoanaleptic, hallucinogenic and empathogenic. Various substituted amphetamines may cause these actions either separately or in combination.

Partial list of substituted amphetamines

Prodrugs of amphetamine/methamphetamine
A variety of prodrugs of amphetamine and/or methamphetamine exist, and include amfecloral, amphetaminil, benzphetamine, clobenzorex, D-deprenyl, dimethylamphetamine, ethylamphetamine, fencamine, fenethylline, fenproporex, furfenorex, lisdexamfetamine, mefenorex, prenylamine, and selegiline.

Structure

Amphetamines are a subgroup of the substituted phenethylamine class of compounds. Substitution of hydrogen atoms results in a large class of compounds. Typical reaction is substitution by methyl and sometimes ethyl groups at the amine and phenyl sites:

History

Ephedra was used 5000 years ago in China as a medicinal plant; its active ingredients are alkaloids ephedrine, pseudoephedrine, norephedrine (phenylpropanolamine) and norpseudoephedrine (cathine). Natives of Yemen and Ethiopia have a long tradition of chewing khat leaves to achieve a stimulating effect. The active substances of khat are cathinone and, to a lesser extent, cathine.

Amphetamine was first synthesized in 1887 by Romanian chemist Lazăr Edeleanu, although its pharmacological effects remained unknown until the 1930s. MDMA was produced in 1912 (in 1914, according to other sources) as an intermediate product.  However, this synthesis also went largely unnoticed. In the 1920s, both methamphetamine and the dextrorotatory optical isomer of amphetamine, dextroamphetamine, were synthesized.  This synthesis was a by-product of a search for ephedrine, a bronchodilator used to treat asthma extracted exclusively from natural sources. Over-the-counter use of substituted amphetamines was initiated in the early 1930s by the pharmaceutical company Smith, Kline & French (now part of GlaxoSmithKline), as a medicine (Benzedrine) for colds and nasal congestion. Subsequently, amphetamine was used in the treatment of narcolepsy, obesity, hay fever, orthostatic hypotension, epilepsy, Parkinson's disease, alcoholism and migraine. The "reinforcing" effects of substituted amphetamines were quickly discovered, and the misuse of substituted amphetamines had been noted as far back as 1936.

During World War II, amphetamines were used by the German military to keep their tank crews awake for long periods, and treat depression. It was noticed that extended rest was required after such artificially induced activity. The widespread use of substituted amphetamines began in postwar Japan and quickly spread to other countries. Modified "designer amphetamines", such as MDA and PMA, have gained in popularity since the 1960s. In 1970, the United States adopted "the Controlled Substances Act" that limited non-medical use of substituted amphetamines. Street use of PMA was noted in 1972. MDMA emerged as a substitute for MDA in the early 1970s.  American chemist Alexander Shulgin first synthesized the drug in 1976 and through him the drug was briefly introduced into psychotherapy. Recreational use grew and in 1985 MDMA was banned by the US authorities in an emergency scheduling initiated by the Drug Enforcement Administration.

Since the mid-1990s, MDMA has become a popular entactogenic drug among the youth and quite often non-MDMA substances were sold as ecstasy.  Ongoing trials are investigating its efficacy as an adjunct to psychotherapy in the management of treatment-resistant post-traumatic stress disorder (PTSD).

Legal status

See also
 Substituted phenethylamines
 Substituted methylenedioxyphenethylamines
 Substituted cathinones
 Substituted phenylmorpholines
 2Cs, DOx, 25-NB
 Substituted tryptamines
 Substituted α-alkyltryptamines
 D-Deprenyl, MAO-B inhibitor prodrug that metabolizes into both D-amphetamine and D-methamphetamine
 Amphetaminil, brand name Aponeuron a largely-market-withdrawn (due to abuse liability) amphetamine

References

Bibliography

External links

 
Amphetamine
Chemical classes of psychoactive drugs

de:Phenylethylamine#Amphetamine